Andi Zumbach (born 24 November 1969) is a Swiss sports shooter. He competed at the 1992 Summer Olympics and the 1996 Summer Olympics.

References

1969 births
Living people
Swiss male sport shooters
Olympic shooters of Switzerland
Shooters at the 1992 Summer Olympics
Shooters at the 1996 Summer Olympics
People from Baar, Switzerland
Sportspeople from the canton of Zug